The Examination of Savonarola is an 1846 oil on canvas painting by the French history painter François Marius Granet, showing the trial of Savonarola. It is now in the Musée des Beaux-Arts de Lyon.

References

French paintings
History paintings
Paintings in the collection of the Museum of Fine Arts of Lyon
1846 paintings
Cultural depictions of Girolamo Savonarola